The UK Singles Chart is one of many music charts compiled by the Official Charts Company that calculates the best-selling singles of the week in the United Kingdom. Since 2004 the chart has been based on the sales of both physical singles and digital downloads, with airplay figures excluded from the official chart. This list shows singles that peaked in the Top 10 of the UK Singles Chart during 2009, as well as singles which peaked in 2008 and 2010 but were in the top 10 in 2009. The entry date is when the song appeared in the top 10 for the first time (week ending, as published by the Official Charts Company, which is six days after the chart is announced).

One-hundred and twenty-nine singles were in the top ten in 2009. Ten singles from 2008 remained in the top 10 for several weeks at the beginning of the year, while "TiK ToK" by Kesha, "Starstrukk" by 3OH!3 featuring Katy Perry, "Don't Stop Believing" by Journey, "Look for Me" by Chipmunk featuring Talay Riley, "The Climb" by Joe McElderry and "3 Words" by Cheryl featuring will.i.am were all released in 2009 but did not reach their peak until 2010. "Broken Strings" by James Morrison featuring Nelly Furtado was the only song from 2008 to reach its peak in 2009. Forty-three artists scored multiple entries in the top 10 in 2009. Emeli Sandé, Lady Gaga, Michael Bublé, Pixie Lott, Taylor Swift and Tinchy Stryder were among the many artists who achieved their first UK charting top 10 single in 2009.

The 2008 Christmas number-one, "Hallelujah" by X Factor series 5 winner Alexandra Burke, remained at number-one for the first week of 2009. The first new number-one single of the year was "Just Dance" by Lady Gaga. Overall, thirty-one different singles peaked at number-one in 2009, with Lady Gaga and The Black Eyed Peas (3) both having the most singles hit that position.

Background
One-hundred and twenty-nine singles charted in the top 10 in 2009, with one-hundred and eleven singles reaching their peak this year.

Forty-three artists scored multiple entries in the top 10 in 2009. Chipmunk secured the record for most top 10 hits in 2009 with five hit singles.

Chart debuts
Sixty-five artists achieved their first top 10 single in 2009, either as a lead or featured artist. Of these, four went on to record another hit single that year: Joe McElderry, Kesha, La Roux and Pitbull. N-Dubz and Pixie Lott had two more singles reach the top ten. Lady Gaga and Tinchy Stryder both scored three more top 10 singles in 2009. Chipmunk had four other entries in his breakthrough year.

The following table (collapsed on desktop site) does not include acts who had previously charted as part of a group and secured their first top 10 solo single.

Notes
Amelle from Sugababes (who joined the group in 2005) had a solo hit with Tinchy Stryder on "Never Leave You". "Fight for This Love" was Cheryl's debut single as a solo artist independent of Girls Aloud. The song reached number-one.

Young Soul Rebels was a charity super-group that recorded the song "I Got Soul" to raise money for War Child UK. Among the participants were Pixie Lott, VV Brown, N-Dubz, Tinchy Stryder, Frankmusik, Kid British, Ironik, Chip, McLean, MPHO, Bashy and the London Community Gospel Choir. Comedian Peter Kay had previous chart entries on "Is This the Way to Amarillo", "(I'm Gonna Be) 500 Miles" and as Geraldine McQueen but the Animated All Star Band was a new act to the chart.

Joe McElderry sang on "You Are Not Alone" with his fellow X Factor series six contestants prior to his debut solo hit "The Climb". Jedward and Olly Murs would both go on to record top 10 singles in later years. Although "Beat Again" was the first solo chart entry for JLS, they sang on "Hero" during their time on series 5 of The X Factor, which peaked at number-one in 2008.

Songs from films
Original songs from various films entered the top 10 throughout the year. These included "Jai Ho! (You Are My Destiny)" (from Slumdog Millionaire) and "Sweet Disposition" (500 Days of Summer). "The Climb" from Hannah Montana: The Movie was also covered by Joe McElderry as his winning song on The X Factor.

Charity singles
A number of singles recorded for charity reached the top 10 in the charts in 2009. The Comic Relief single was a cover version of Depeche Mode's "Just Can't Get Enough" by The Saturdays, peaking at number two on 14 March 2009 (week ending) after a performance on the telethon. A second single was released for Comic Relief, "(Barry) Islands in the Stream", a parody of "Islands in the Stream" by Kenny Rogers and Dolly Parton, and reached number-one for a single week. It was performed by Ruth Jones and Rob Brydon, as their characters from the British sitcom Gavin & Stacey, Vanessa Jenkins and Bryn West, and also featured Welsh singer Tom Jones and Robin Gibb from the Bee Gees.

A charity supergroup known as Young Soul Rebels, which included acts such as Pixie Lott, N-Dubz and Tinchy Stryder, peaked at number ten on 31 October 2009 (week ending) with "I Got Soul", an adapted version of "All These Things That I've Done" by The Killers. The song was raising money for War Child UK.

The finalists from the sixth series of The X Factor (which included winner Joe McElderry, Olly Murs and Jedward) got together for a single, "You Are Not Alone", which had been a hit for Michael Jackson. It reached number one on 28 November 2009 (week ending) with profits going to benefit Great Ormond Street Hospital.

The Children in Need single for 2009 was created by comedian Peter Kay. His 'All Star Animated Band' featured British children's cartoon characters including Bob the Builder, Fireman Sam and Postman Pat. The song, "The Official BBC Children in Need Medley", comprised a mashup of covers of seven popular songs: in order, "Can You Feel It", "Don't Stop", "Jai Ho!", "Tubthumping", "Never Forget", "Hey Jude" and "One Day Like This". It reached number one on 5 December 2009 (week ending).

Best-selling singles
Lady Gaga had the best-selling single of the year with "Poker Face". The song spent thirteen weeks in the top 10 (including three weeks at number one), sold over 882,000 copies and was certified platinum by the BPI. "I Gotta Feeling" by The Black Eyed Peas came in second place, selling more than 848,000 copies and losing out by around 24,000 sales. Lady Gaga featuring Colby O'Donis's "Just Dance, "Fight for This Love" from Cheryl Cole and "The Climb" by Joe McElderry made up the top five. Singles by La Roux, The Black Eyed Peas ("Boom Boom Pow"), Rage Against the Machine, Alexandra Burke featuring Flo Rida and The Black Eyed Peas ("Meet Me Halfway") were also in the top ten best-selling singles of the year.

Top-ten singles
Key

Entries by artist

The following table shows artists who achieved two or more top 10 entries in 2009, including singles that reached their peak in 2008 or 2010. The figures include both main artists and featured artists, while appearances on ensemble charity records are also counted for each artist. The total number of weeks an artist spent in the top ten in 2009 is also shown.

Notes

  Released as the official single for Comic Relief.
  Originally peaked at number 1 in February 1983 but returned to the Top 10 at number 10 following the death of Michael Jackson.
  "Bad Romance" re-entered the top 10 at number 8 on 28 November 2009.
  Released as the official single for Children in Need.
  Figure includes an appearance on the charity single "I Got Soul" by the collective known as The Young Soul Rebels.
  Figure includes appearance on Ironik's "Hold Me Closer".
  Figure includes appearances on Keri Hilson's "Knock You Down", Mr Hudson's "Supernova" and Jay-Z's "Run This Town".
  Figure includes appearance on Tinchy Stryder's "Number 1".
  Figure includes song that peaked in 2008.
  Figure includes song that peaked in 2010.
  Figure includes single as part of Girls Aloud.
  Figure includes three singles with the group The Black Eyed Peas.
  Figure includes single with the group Pussycat Dolls.
  Figure includes appearance on "You Are Not Alone" as part of The X Factor UK 2009 finalists.
  Originally peaked at number 21 in 1988 but peaked at number 2 following the death of Michael Jackson.
 "Sex on Fire" spent 8 consecutive weeks in the top 10 between September and November 2008, including three consecutive weeks at number-one. The song re-entered the top 10 at number 6 on 12 September 2009 (week ending) after a performance of the song by Jamie Archer on The X Factor.
  Figure includes appearance on Cheryl Cole's "3 Words".
  Figure includes appearance on Tinchy Stryder's "Never Leave You".
  Figure includes appearance on David Guetta's "Sexy Chick".
  Figure includes appearance on Jay-Z's "Empire State of Mind".
  Figure includes appearance on Alexandra Burke's "Bad Boys".
  Figure includes appearances on T.I.'s "Dead and Gone" and Ciara's "Love Sex Magic".
  Figure includes appearance on 3OH!3's "Starstrukk".
  Figure includes appearance on Flo Rida's "Right Round".
  Figure includes appearances on Jay Sean's "Down" and Kevin Rudolf's "Let It Rock".
  Figure includes appearance on A.R. Rahman & The Pussycat Dolls' "Jai Ho! (You are My Destiny)".
  Figure includes appearance on Jay-Z's "Run This Town".
  Figure includes appearance on Tinchy Stryder's "Take Me Back".
  "TiK ToK" reached its peak of number four on 9 January 2010 (week ending).
  "The Climb" reached its peak of number one on 2 January 2010 (week ending). 
  "Look for Me" reached its peak of number seven on 16 January 2010 (week ending).
  "Starstrukk" reached its peak of number three on 16 January 2010 (week ending).
  "Don't Stop Believin'" reached its peak of number six on 16 January 2010 (week ending).

See also
2009 in British music

References
General

Specific

External links
2009 singles chart archive at the Official Charts Company (click on relevant week)

United Kingdom Top 10 Singles
Top 10 singles
2009